Scott Spann may refer to:
 Scott Spann (swimmer), American swimmer
 Scott Spann (surgeon), his father, orthopaedic surgeon